Adara Networks (stylized as "ADARA Networks") is an American software company.

History
The company creates SDN (software-defined networking) infrastructure orchestration software and provides cloud computing. It has several dozen partners in its channel program. Adara's cloud software includes an SDI Visualizer for topological rendering, an SLA Manager for determining cost efficiency, and use Sirius Routers. Afterwards the company developed its Horizon SDA Platform, which has an Ecliptic SDN controller, Axis vSwitch, SoftSwitch, and cloud computing engine.

In 2008 Adara developed a networking electronic medical records project for the US Congress. Adara has served on Industry Advisory Panels for the Congress as well.

The company has held contracts with the Department of Defense, and spent its first ten years or so working in the public sphere before opening up to private companies, including SMEs, in 2011.

In 2012 Adara created a full stack network for its cloud, and in 2013 its controller became open source. Then in 2016, Adara partnered with Calient Technologies to develop an integrated SD-WAN. The company's CEO is Eric Johnson.

iN 2020 ADARA Networks were acknowledged as an Industry Leader in SDN.

References

External links 

 Official page
 Twitter

1998 establishments in California
American companies established in 1998
Companies based in San Jose, California
Software companies based in the San Francisco Bay Area
Software companies established in 1998
Software companies of the United States